Sarab Hammam (also Romanized as Sarāb Ḩammām, Sarāb-e-Hammān, Sarab Hamman, and Sarab Hammān; also known as Sarāb-e Ḩammām-e Darvīshhā, Sarāi Hamām, Sarāy Ḩammām, and Sheykh Ḩoseynābād) is a village in Jayedar Rural District, in the Central District of Pol-e Dokhtar County, Lorestan Province, Iran. At the 2006 census, its population was 1,108, in 227 families.

References 

Towns and villages in Pol-e Dokhtar County